Que sera or Que sera, sera may also refer to:

Film and television
Que sera, sera (film), a 2002 Brazilian comedy
Que Sera (film), a 2014 Sri Lankan comedy romance
"Que Sera Sera" (House), a 2006 TV episode 
Que Sera, Sera (TV series), a 2007 South Korean TV series

Music
 Que Sera Sera (album), by Johnny Thunders, 1985
 "Que Sera, Sera (Whatever Will Be, Will Be)", a popular song recorded by Doris Day in 1956
 "Que Sera" (Justice Crew song), 2014 
 "Que Sera", a song by Miley Cyrus on the 2010 soundtrack album Hannah Montana Forever
 "Que Sera", a 1995 song by Ace of Base
 "Que Sera", a 2009 song by O'Hooley & Tidow
 "Que sera", a 2004 song by Wax Tailor

Other
 Que Sera crystal also called Llanite

See also

 "K Cera Cera", a 1993 single by The K Foundation presents The Red Army Choir
 "Che sarà", 1971 Italian song
 "Que Sera Mi Vida (If You Should Go)", a 1979 song by the Gibson Brothers